In Native American legend, Lelawala was a beautiful maiden of the peaceful tribe of the Iroquois that was venturing in waterfalls one day, but happened to fall of her canoe. The thunder god Hé-no then saved her, as Hé-no was the one who lived behind the falls. At the time, her canoe was broken so Hé-no offered to build a new one. On the day he finished building the canoe, a huge snake with venom so powerful it could kill a whole village, was headed towards the village of Lelawala, but Hé-no then threw a flaming spear at the snake. The snake landed on top of the falls, creating the curved shape of Horseshoe Falls.

Lelawala is known as the original Maid of the Mist.

Adaptations 
Henry Hadley composed a cantata entitled Lelawala: A Legend of Niagara in 1898, in which the maiden Lelawala sacrifices herself to appease the "Thunder Waters" and save her tribe from a famine. Charles Wakefield Cadman's three-act operetta Lelawala: The Maid of Niagara (1926) is based on the story of Lelawala. The libretto includes a number of colonialist plot points, including Lelawala learning about Christian forgiveness from a white missionary.

References 

Goddesses of the indigenous peoples of North America